The name apophyllite refers to a specific group of phyllosilicates, a class of minerals. Originally, the group name referred to a specific mineral, but was redefined in 1978 to stand for a class of minerals of similar chemical makeup that comprise a solid solution series, and includes the members fluorapophyllite-(K), fluorapophyllite-(Na), hydroxyapophyllite-(K). The name apophyllite is derived from the Greek ἀποφυλλίζω apophylliso, meaning "it flakes off", a reference to this class's tendency to flake apart when heated, due to water loss. Exfoliation of apophyllite is also possible by treating it with acids or simply by rubbing it. These minerals are typically found as secondary minerals in vesicles in basalt or other volcanic rocks.  A recent change (2008) in the nomenclature system used for this group was approved by the International Mineralogical Association, removing the prefixes from the species names and using suffixes to designate the species. A subsequent nomenclature change approved by the International Mineralogical Association in 2013 renamed the minerals to include both suffixes and prefixes, as shown above.

Though relatively unfamiliar to the general public, apophyllites are fairly prevalent around the world, with specimens coming from some of the world's most well-known mineral localities. These localities include: Jalgaon, India; the Harz Mountains of Germany, Mont Saint-Hilaire in Canada, and Kongsberg, Norway, with other locations in Scotland, Ireland, Brazil, Japan, and throughout the United States.

Structure
Apophyllite has an unusual structure for a phyllosilicate. Whereas most phyllosilicates have a T layer (silica backbone) consisting of interlocked 6-fold rings of silica tetrahedra, with pseudohexagonal symmetry, the T layer in apophyllite consists of interlocked 4-fold and 8-fold rings of silica tetrahedra with true tetragonal symmetry.

Species of apophyllite
Fluorapophyllite-(K) (formerly fluorapophyllite, apophyllite-(KF)), KCa4Si8O20(F,OH)·8H2O - white, colorless, yellow, green, violet
Hydroxyapophyllite-(K) (formerly hydroxyapophyllite, apophyllite-(KOH)), KCa4Si8O20(OH,F)·8H2O - white, colorless
Fluorapophyllite-(Na) (formerly natroapophyllite, apophyllite-(NaF)), NaCa4Si8O20F·8H2O - brown, yellow, colorless
Fluorapophyllit-(Cs) (new) CsCa4(Si8O20)F·8H2O
Fluorapophyllit-(NH4) (new) NH4Ca4(Si8O20)F⋅8H2O

See also
 Carbonatite
 Gyrolite
 Zeolite
 List of minerals

References

 MinDat Listing
 Mineral Galleries
 
  This describes the older definition as a specific mineral.

Phyllosilicates
Sodium minerals
Potassium minerals
Calcium minerals
Tetragonal minerals
Minerals in space group 128
Fluorine minerals